Thomas Connell (born 4 March 1869, date of death unknown) was a New Zealand and Australian cricketer. He played one first-class match for New South Wales in 1897 and two first-class matches for Wellington in 1901.

See also
 List of New South Wales representative cricketers
 List of Wellington representative cricketers

References

External links
 

1869 births
Year of death missing
Australian cricketers
New South Wales cricketers
Wellington cricketers
Cricketers from Invercargill